Keitrace FC is a football club based in Monrovia Liberia. 

The team plays in Liberian Premier League.

Stadium
Their home Stadium is the Blue Field Sports Ground in Monrovia.

League participations
 Liberian Premier League: 2013–
 Liberian Second Division League: ????–2013

References

External links

Football clubs in Liberia
Sport in Monrovia